Eugene Aderson Keeton (July 29, 1896 – death date unknown) was a professional baseball pitcher in the Negro leagues. He played with the Cleveland Tate Stars in 1922 and the Dayton Marcos in 1926.

References

External links
 and Seamheads

1896 births
Year of death missing
Cleveland Tate Stars players
Dayton Marcos players
Baseball pitchers
Baseball players from Kentucky